Changuinola is a district (distrito) of Bocas del Toro Province in Panama. The population according to the 2010 census was 98.310  The district covers a total area of 3,995 km². The capital lies at the city of Changuinola. Major industries include tourism and agriculture.

Administrative divisions
Changuinola District is divided administratively into the following corregimientos:

 Changuinola
 Guabito
 Teribe
 El Empalme
El Silencio
 Las Tablas
 Las Delicias
 Cochigro
 La Gloria
 Barriada 4 de Abril
 Finca 30
 Finca 6
 Finca 60

On 8 June 2015 the new Almirante District was created from the following corregimientos which were split off from Changuinola District:

 Puerto Almirante
 Nance de Risco
 Valle del Risco
 Valle de Aguas Arriba
 Barriada Guaymí
 Barrio Francés

Climate
Changuinola has a coastal location with a tropical climate.  The area does not have a predictable dry season. The driest times are late August to mid-October, February, and March. Changuinola is humid. Thundershowers and heavy rain are common. Normal temperatures are consistent all year (Hi: 80°-84 °F, low: 71°-75 °F). Due to its low latitude, sunrise is around 6 AM, and sunset is around 6 PM local time. These times vary slightly during the year. Weather data is collected at Captain Manuel Nino International Airport in Changuinola.

References

Districts of Bocas del Toro Province